In mathematics, the dual q-Hahn polynomials are a family of basic hypergeometric orthogonal polynomials in the basic Askey scheme.  give a detailed list of their properties.

Definition
The  polynomials are given in terms of basic hypergeometric functions.

References

 

Orthogonal polynomials
Q-analogs
Special hypergeometric functions